Fred Anthony Trello, Sr. (November 14, 1929 – March 28, 2006) was a Democratic member of the Pennsylvania House of Representatives.

Biography
Born on November 14, 1929, Trello was a 1949 graduate of Coraopolis High School. 

He served in the Korean War and earned a degree in 1951 from the Air Force Electronics School. He also earned a degree from Robert Morris College in 1957.

Trello got his start in politics as a Democratic County Committeeman for Coraopolis, Pennsylvania. He was first elected to represent the 45th legislative district in the Pennsylvania House of Representatives in 1974, a position he held until his retirement prior to the 2002 elections.

Death
Trello died on March 28, 2006. He was survived by five grandchildren: Sofia Muzzatti, Julia Muzzatti, Gia Trello, Dominic Trello, and Jaclyn Trello Keys.

References

External links

1929 births
2006 deaths
Robert Morris University alumni
Democratic Party members of the Pennsylvania House of Representatives
20th-century American politicians